Dynomak is a spheromak fusion reactor concept developed by the University of Washington using U.S. Department of Energy funding.

A dynomak is defined as a spheromak that is started and maintained by magnetic flux injection. The dynomak is formed when an alternating current is used to induce a magnetic flux into plasma.  A transformer uses the same induction process to create a secondary current.  Once formed, the plasma inside the Dynomak relaxes into its lowest energy state, while conserving overall flux.  This is known as a Taylor state and inside the machine what is formed is a plasma structure called a spheromak.  The Dynomak is a kind of Spheromak that is started and driven by externally induced magnetic fields.

Technical Roots 

Plasma is a fluid that conducts electricity, which gives it the unique property that it can be self-structured into smoke-ring-like objects such as Field-reversed configurations and spheromaks.  A structured plasma has the advantage that it is hotter, denser and more controllable which makes it a good choice for a fusion reactor. But forming these plasma structures has been challenging since the first structures were observed in 1959  because they are inherently unstable.

In 1974, Dr. John B Taylor proposed that a spheromak could be formed by inducing a magnetic flux into a loop plasma.  The plasma would then relax naturally into a spheromak also known as a Taylor State.  This process worked if the plasma:

 Conserved the total magnetic flux
 Minimized the total energy

These claims were later checked by Marshall Rosenbluth in 1979.  In 1974, Dr. Taylor could only use results from the ZETA pinch device to back up these claims.  But, since then, Taylor states have been formed in multiple machines including: 
 Compact Torus Experiment (CTX) at Los Alamos. The CTX operated from ~1979 to ~1987 at Los Alamos.  It reached electron temperatures of 4.6 million kelvin  ran for 3 microseconds  and had a plasma to magnetic pressure ratio of 0.2.  
 Sustained Spheromak Physics Experiment (SSPX) at Livermore was a more advanced version of the CTX that was used to measure the relaxation process that led to a Taylor state.  The SSPX was working at Livermore from 1999 until 2007. 
 Caltech Spheromak Experiment at Caltech was a small experiment run by Dr. Paul Bellans’ lab at Caltech from ~2000 to ~2010.  
 Helicity Injected Torus-Steady Inductive (HIT-SI) at the University of Washington was run by Dr. Jarboe from 2004 to 2012 and was the precursor to the Dynomak. This machine created 90 kiloamps of stable plasma current over several (<2) microseconds. This machine also showed the first demonstration of Imposed-Dynamo Current Drive (IDCD) in 2011.  The IDCD breakthrough enabled Dr. Jarboes’ group to envision the first reactor-scale version of this machine; called the Dynomak.

The Dynomak evolved from the Helicity Injected Torus-Steady Inductive (HIT-SI) (~2004 to ~2012) experiment that was operated by the University of Washington.  The HIT-SI machine went through several upgrades, the HIT-SI3 (~2013 to ~2020) and HIT-SIU (Post ~2020) were both variations on the same machine.  These machines demonstrated that an inductive current could be used to make and sustain the Spheromak plasma structure.

Magnetic Induction Drive 

By definition, a Dynomak is a plasma structure that is started, formed, and sustained using magnetic flux injection.  Transformers use a similar process; a magnetic flux is created on the primary loop, and this makes an alternating current on the secondary side. Because of Faraday's law of induction, only a changing magnetic field can induce a secondary current – this is why there is no such thing as a direct current transformer.  In the case of the Dynomak, magnetic induction is used to create a plasma current inside a plasma filled chamber.  This gets the plasma moving and the system eventually relaxes into a Taylor state or spheromak.  The relaxation process involves the flow of Magnetic helicity (a twist in the field lines) from the injectors into the center of the machine.

Supporters of this heating approach have argued that induction is 2-3 orders of magnitude more efficient than RF or neutral beam heating.  If this is true, it gives the Dynomak several distinct advantages over other fusion approaches like tokamaks or Magnetic mirrors.  But this is an open area of research; below are some examples of how effective inductive drive was in creating plasma current inside the dynomak.

The Dynomak uses injectors, which are curved arms that are attached to the main chamber.  An alternating current is applied around the curve of these arms, which creates the magnetic flux that drives the dynomak.  The University of Washington experimented with two and three numbers of injectors.  The phase of the alternating current is offset to allow for the continuous injection of flux into the dynomak.  In the case of two injectors the drive is offset by 90 degrees, while the case of three injectors offsets the current by 60 degrees.

Advantages 
Because the spheromak plasma structure forms naturally, supporters have argued that it has several inherent advantages, these are listed below. 
 Because the structure forms naturally, it may avoid the kink, interchange, and other plasma instabilities that normally plague structures. For this reason, it has been argued that the dynomak can pressurize and heat its plasma up to the Mercer limit on beta number. If true, this could ultimately shrink the reactor when compared to other fusion approaches.
 Supporters have argued that the inductive drive is 2-3 orders of magnitude more efficient then RF heating or neutral beam heating.  But this is an open area of research. 
 The Dynomak has no central solenoid, when compared to a Tokamak; lower the cost and power requirements for the reactor. 
 It has been argued that this machine does not need additional heating hardware like neutral beam injection.

As of 2014 plasma densities reached 5x1019 m−3, temperatures of 60 eV, and maximum operation time of 1.5 ms. No confinement time results were available. At those temperatures no fusion, alpha heating or neutron production were expected.

Commercialization 
Once the technical principals were proven in the HIT-SI machine, Dr. Jarboe challenged his students in a University of Washington class to come up with a fusion reactor based on this approach.  The students designed the Dynomak as a reactor-level power plant that built off the discoveries made from the HIT-SI and earlier machines.

Eventually, these students formed CT Fusion as a spin out from the University of Washington to commercialize the Dynomak in 2015. The company has exclusive rights to 3 University of Washington patents and raised over 3.6 million from 2015 to 2019 in public and private funding.  The acronym CT stands for Compact Toroid, which is what spheromaks were referred to for decades.  The company has received funding as part of an ARPA-E funding award for fusion.   
 
Unlike other fusion reactor designs (such as ITER), the Dynomak would be, according to its engineering team, comparable in costs to a conventional coal plant. Dynomak was expected to cost a tenth of ITER and produce five times as much energy at an efficiency of 40 percent. A one gigawatt Dynomak would cost US$2.7 billion compared to US$2.8 billion for a coal plant.

Design
Dynomak incorporates an ITER-developed cryogenic pumping system. Spheromak use an oblate spheroid instead of a tokamak configuration without a central core and without ITER's large, complex superconducting magnets. The magnetic fields are produced by putting electrical fields into the center of the plasma using superconducting tapes wrapped around the vessel, such that the plasma contains itself.

Dynomak is smaller simpler and cheaper to build than ITER, while producing more power. The fusion reaction is self-sustaining as excess heat is drawn off by a molten salt blanket to power a steam turbine.  The prototype was about one tenth the scale of a commercial project, is able to sustain plasma efficiently. Higher output would require increased scale and higher plasma temperature.

Criticisms 
The Dynomak relies on a copper wall to conserve and direct the magnetic flux that is injected into the machine.  This wall butts right up against the plasma, creating the possibility of high conduction losses through the metal.  The HIT-SI coated the inside of the copper wall with an aluminum-oxide insulator to reduce these losses, but this could still be a major loss mechanism if the machine goes to fusion reactor conditions.

Additionally, the injection of magnetic helicity into the field forces the machine to break the magnetic flux surfaces that hold and sustain the plasma structure.  The breaking of these surfaces has been cited as a reason that the Dynomaks' heating mechanism does not work as efficiently as predicted.

Lastly, the Dynomak has a complex chamber geometry, which presents challenges for maintainability and vacuum formation.

See also
 Spheromak
 Field-reversed configuration, a similar concept
 Spherical tokamak, essentially a spheromak formed around a central conductor/magnet
 Taylor state
 John Bryan Taylor

References

Research projects
Fusion power
University of Washington
Plasma physics